Vipers SC is a professional football Ugandan club based on Kitende, Wakiso District. It competes in the Uganda Premier League, the top flight of Ugandan football. The club was founded in 1969 as Bunamwaya FC.

History 
The club was founded as Bunamwaya FC in 1969.

Since 2006, after the team was promoted from the Regional Leagues (2nd division at the time), Vipers SC have played in the Uganda Premier League. They have finished in the table's top half on every single season ever since being promoted to the Premier League.

With the backing of president Lawrence Mulindwa, the club signed several important players for the 2010 season, including seven members of the Ugandan National Team at the time. In this season, Bunamwaya won their first ever Premier League title with two rounds to spare. They did not participate in the 2011 CAF Champions League for financial reasons.

Bunamwaya were unable to replicate their success in a short succeding period, finishing 3rd in 2011 and finishing as runners-up in both Cup and League on 2012.

On 21 August 2012, Bunamwaya was renamed to Vipers SC in order to "elevate the status of the club" and to "make them more nationally relevant".

Vipers lost the 2013 Uganda Cup final in heartbreaking fashion. After taking the lead in the 78th minute with a penalty scored by Joseph Mprade, the Victoria University scored a goal in the final seconds of the match and then went on to win the penalty shootouts by 5–3.

League success finally came again in the 2014–15 season after a nearly unbeaten league campaign, which saw Vipers only falls out to a defeat on a single match. They were led by Edward Golola. The club had close ties with Kitende's St. Mary's School, with 17 players of the 2015 title-winning squad hailing from the school.

The league title led Vipers to try out on continental competition for the first time. In the 2016 CAF Champions League, they played and lost their first ever continental match by 1–2 on aggregate to Nigerian club Enyimba FC in the preliminary round.

Vipers finished as runners up in the 2015–16 season, but saw their first ever success in the Uganda Cup, beating Onduparaka FC by 3–1 in the final. The win qualified them for the 2017 CAF Confederation Cup. In the preliminary round, they played against Volcan Club from Comoros, and ended barely winning the match on the away-goal rule after drawing 1–1 on aggregate. On the first round, they fell short to Platinum Stars of South Africa in the first round, having lost by 3–2 on aggregate. This loss came after conceding a 90th minute penalty in the last moment of the tie.

The Vipers participated in the 2018–19 CAF Champions League qualifying rounds. They played and won the preliminary round by the away-goal rule, after tying 1–1 with Al-Merrikh SC from Sudan. In the first round, they fell one match shy to the group stage against CS Constantine of Algeria, after a 0–3 defeat on aggregate.

In may 2020, Vipers was declared champions of the 2019–20 Uganda Premier League while leading the table with 54 points after 25 matches. This league title was their fourth in their history. The league title was awarded before its completion as it was cancelled mid-season by the FUFA due to the COVID-19 outbreak.
                                       
At the 2021–22 season, with four remaining matches, Vipers won another league title after a 3–0 win against Express FC, leading the team to qualify to the qualifying rounds of the 2022–23 CAF Champions League. 

On the preliminary round of the competition, they were able to win their tie with relative ease, winning both matches played against Olympic Real de Bangui from Central African Republic. On the first round, they were paired against TP Mazembe from DR Congo. After tying both matches by 0–0, penalty shoot-outs were required. Vipers ended up winning the shoot-out by 4–2, qualifying them to the group stage of a CAF Champions League for the first time ever. 

On the 2022–23 CAF Champions League group stage, the club was paired to the Group C alongside Raja CA (Morocco), Simba (Tanzania) and Horoya (Guinea).

Stadium 
They play at St. Mary's Stadium-Kitende, which has a capacity of 25,000. The stadium was completely refurbished in 2018 and includes artificial turf.

Achievements 
Ugandan Premier League (5):
 2010, 2015, 2017–2018, 2019–2020, 2021-2022
Ugandan Cup (2)
 2016, 2021
Ugandan Super Cup (1)
 2015
Pilsner Super Cup (1)
 2019

Current squad 
; Squad for the 2022–23 CAF Champions League.

Technical team

Former managers
 Robertinho Oliveira
 Cardoso de Carmo

References

External links 
Vipers SC official website
Vipers SC fixtures and results on Goal.com

Football clubs in Uganda
Central Region, Uganda
1969 establishments in Uganda
Vipers SC